John Duncan Campbell (born April 8, 1955 in Ailsa Craig, Ontario) is a retired Canadian harness racing driver. He has been inducted into the Harness Racing Hall of Fame, the Canadian Horse Racing Hall of Fame and Canada's Sports Hall of Fame.

Dunc Campbell and his father before him were Standardbred horsemen. Dunc had two sons Ray and Jack Campbell with his family near London, Ontario. Jack had two sons, John Campbell and Jim Campbell. Ray was a trainer/driver as well as his son Robert Campbell.

Both John and Jim Campbell have established themselves in the upper echelon of harness racing, however many consider John Campbell the greatest reinsman of all-era's.

Campbell's dollar purse earnings, exceed any currently active driver or jockey. John has won more dollars-in-purses at any North American Track (i. e, The Meadowlands Racetrack) than any jockey or driver.

Campbell is considered by many to be the best driver in harness racing history. In 1976, harness racing was changed forever by the opening of the Meadowlands Racetrack in East Rutherford, New Jersey. The Meadowlands, also known as the Big M, is a one-mile harness track which attracted the very best harness horses, trainers and drivers in North America. Entering the 1970s, harness races were mostly contested with the horses racing in single file until they reached the homestretch, where the real race began. Also, most horses were driven by their owners or trainers. When the Meadowlands opened, a new breed of driver emerged called the catch-driver. The catch-driver was usually younger, lighter and more athletic and was able to make the horses go faster than the previous generation of driver. Campbell was the dominant catch driver of the late 1970s and 1980s and well into the 1990s. Campbell was a pioneer in the development of the modern catch driver and today, most top drivers are catch drivers.

He was the youngest driver ever elected into the U.S. Harness Racing Hall of Fame in 1990 at age 35 and is also a member of the Canadian Horse Racing Hall of Fame. He was inducted into the London (Ont.) Sports Hall of Fame in its inaugural class, 2002.

Campbell won  the Hambletonian Stakes for a sixth time in 2006 with Glidemaster.

On July 12, 2008, Campbell won his 10,000th race as a driver by guiding Share the Delight to victory in the sixth race at Meadowlands Racetrack.

Campbell is a resident of River Vale, New Jersey.

References

External links
YouTube video titled "In The Sulky with John Campbell - June 17, 2016"
John Campbell Fan page at United States Trotting Association

Animal sportspeople from Ontario
Canadian harness racing drivers
Canadian Horse Racing Hall of Fame inductees
United States Harness Racing Hall of Fame inductees
Recipients of the Meritorious Service Decoration
People from River Vale, New Jersey
1955 births
Living people